Robert Hiller (born 14 October 1942) is a former England international rugby union player.

Hiller was England's first choice fullback between 1968 and 1972. He made his England debut against Wales at Twickenham on 20 January 1968 and won the last of his 19 caps against Ireland at Twickenham on 12 February 1972. He captained England in seven internationals and scored 138 points, an England record at the time of his retirement which has subsequently been beaten. 

Hiller fell out with the rugby authorities on numerous occasions. He was dropped three times: in 1970 against France, even though he had been appointed captain at the start of the season, and England were thrashed, and he was immediately reinstated; in 1971 when he was left out against Wales; and in 1972 when he had already decided to retire at the end of the season.

He made two tours with the British and Irish Lions - to South Africa in 1968 and to New Zealand in 1971 although he played in no international matches for the Lions. He played club rugby for Harlequin F.C. 

In 1966, while he was studying at St Edmund Hall, Oxford, before he began his international rugby career, Hiller played eight first-class cricket matches for the Oxford University Cricket Club. He took 17 wickets, at an average of 29.05, and won his cricket blue.

He later taught at Bec Grammar School in Tooting, London, where he had been a pupil. From 1978 until his retirement, he taught mathematics at King's College School, Wimbledon.

References

External links
 CricketArchive: Bob Hiller
 Lions profile

1942 births
Living people
Alumni of St Edmund Hall, Oxford
English rugby union players
British & Irish Lions rugby union players from England
England international rugby union players
Rugby union fullbacks
English cricketers
Oxford University cricketers
Harlequin F.C. players
Rugby union players from Woking
Surrey RFU players